The 2020–21 UEFA Nations League C was the third division of the 2020–21 edition of the UEFA Nations League, the second season of the international football competition involving the men's national teams of the 55 member associations of UEFA.

Format
Following a format change from the first season, League C was expanded from 15 to 16 teams. The league consisted of UEFA members ranked from 33–48 in the 2018–19 UEFA Nations League overall ranking, split into four groups of four. Each team played six matches within their group, using the home-and-away round-robin format on double matchdays in September, October and November 2020. The winners of each group were promoted to the 2022–23 UEFA Nations League B, and the fourth-placed team of each group advanced to the relegation play-outs.

As League C had four groups while League D had only two, the two League C teams that were to be relegated to the 2022–23 UEFA Nations League D were determined by play-outs in March 2022. Based on the Nations League overall ranking, the best-ranked team faced the fourth-ranked team, and the second-ranked team faced the third-ranked team. Two ties were played over two legs, with each team playing one leg at home (the higher-ranked team hosted the second leg). The team that scored more goals on aggregate over the two legs remained in League C, while the loser was relegated to League D. If the aggregate score was level, extra time was played (the away goals rule was not applied). If still tied after extra time, a penalty shoot-out was used to decide the winner. The away goals rule was originally to be used, but was abolished by the UEFA Executive Committee on 16 December 2021.

Teams

Team changes
The following were the team changes of League C from the 2018–19 season:

The following team changes were initially set to occur in League C, but did not after no teams were relegated due to the format change by UEFA:

Seeding
In the 2020–21 access list, UEFA ranked teams based on the 2018–19 Nations League overall ranking, with a slight modification: teams that were originally relegated in the previous season were ranked immediately below teams promoted prior to the format change. The seeding pots for the league phase were confirmed 4 December 2019, and were based on the access list ranking.

The draw for the league phase took place at the Beurs van Berlage Conference Centre in Amsterdam, Netherlands on 3 March 2020, 18:00 CET. Each group contained one team from each pot.

Groups
The original fixture list was confirmed by UEFA on 3 March 2020 following the draw. On 17 June 2020, the UEFA Executive Committee adjusted the league phase schedule for October and November 2020 to allow for the completion of the UEFA Euro 2020 qualifying play-offs. Following the change, a revised schedule for the October and November 2020 fixtures was released by UEFA on 26 June 2020.

Times are CET/CEST, as listed by UEFA (local times, if different, are in parentheses).

Group 1

Group 2

Group 3

Group 4

Relegation play-outs
The fourth-placed teams of League C participated in the relegation play-outs to determine the two teams which would be relegated. The relegation play-outs were scheduled on the same dates as the 2022 FIFA World Cup qualifying play-offs. If at least one of the teams due to participate in the relegation play-outs had also qualified for the World Cup qualifying play-offs (none ultimately did), the relegation play-outs would have been cancelled, and the teams in League C ranked 47th and 48th in the Nations League overall ranking would have been automatically relegated.

The play-out ties were as follows, with the higher-ranked teams hosting the second leg:
Team ranked first vs. team ranked fourth
Team ranked second vs. team ranked third

Times are CET/CEST, as listed by UEFA (local times, if different, are in parentheses).

Ranking

Summary

|}

Matches

2–2 on aggregate. Kazakhstan won 5–4 on penalties and remained in League C, while Moldova were relegated to League D.

Cyprus won 2–0 on aggregate and remained in League C, while Estonia were relegated to League D.

Goalscorers

Overall ranking
The 16 League C teams were ranked 33rd to 48th overall in the 2020–21 UEFA Nations League according to the following rules:
The teams finishing first in the groups were ranked 33rd to 36th according to the results of the league phase.
The teams finishing second in the groups were ranked 37th to 40th according to the results of the league phase.
The teams finishing third in the groups were ranked 41st to 44th according to the results of the league phase.
The teams finishing fourth in the groups were ranked 45th to 48th according to the results of the league phase.

Notes

References

External links

League C